The Coimbatore–Pollachi line is a railway line between Coimbatore and Pollachi in Tamil Nadu, India. The line is a gateway which connects western Tamil Nadu with south Tamil Nadu. Coimbatore is connected to Madurai and other southern districts through this line. During the gauge conversion the line was closed. It was reopened in 2017 and train service resumed.

History 
The first service started in 1915 from Pollachi to Podanur line as a metre-gauge section and in 2008 the station was closed for the gauge conversion of the Didugul–Podanur. The old metre-gauge track on the stretch was in use for 110 years since the first train chugged in 1898 before it was closed 2008 when work began to convert the metre-gauge railway line to broad gauge as part of the Dindugul–Palakkad section.
On 24 March 2017, CRS successfully completed its speed trial and inspection along with Podanur–Pollachi newly laid broad-gauge line. The inspection was very satisfactory according to CRS. Mr. KA Manohar, Bangalore. Train service resumed in July 2017 and a passenger train was introduced between Coimbatore and Pollachi.

Station
Stations like ,  are present in this section. There has been a request to revive defunct stations like , Nallatipalayam, Koilpalayam and Tamaraikulam.

Gauge conversion 
The line was closed for gauge conversion in 2008. Rail service was stopped for eight years. In 2017, the Coimbatore–Pollachi line gauge conversion was completed and train service resumed with one passenger train. Before the conversion which was completed in April 2017, the line was formerly  between Podanur Junction and Pollachi Junction.

References

5 ft 6 in gauge railways in India
Railway lines opened in 1898
Railway lines closed in 2008
Railway lines opened in 2017
Transport in Coimbatore